Digicel is a Jamaican and Caribbean mobile phone network and home entertainment provider operating in 25 markets worldwide.

Digicel has operated in several countries, including Guyana, Fiji, Haiti, Trinidad and Tobago, St. Lucia, Suriname, and Jamaica.

History
Digicel was founded in 2001 by Irish entrepreneur Denis O'Brien. The company launched in April 2001 in Jamaica. In March 2003, Digicel expanded to St. Lucia and St. Vincent. In 2005, Digicel purchased Cingular Wireless’ Caribbean and Bermudan operations.

In April 2006, Digicel launched its services in Trinidad and Tobago. In May 2006, Digicel began operations in Haïti. Between 2006 and 2008, Digicel expanded into the Central American mainland, as well as the Pacific. In September 2006, it acquired an unrelated mobile phone provider: Digicel Holdings in El Salvador.

In 2007, Digicel acquired U*Mobile in Guyana, and launched in Suriname in December.

OUR court rulings 
In April 2002, Digicel received permission from Jamaica's then-minister of industry, commerce and technology, Phillip Paulwell, to disregard the interconnectivity fee ceiling issued by the Offices of Utilities Regulation (OUR). Following a judicial review, it was determined that Paulwell did not have the power to make this decision. Digicel appealed the ruling to the Jamaican Supreme Court in 2003 and won. OUR appealed the decision to the appellate court, which ruled Paulwell's decision was outside his powers and OUR didn't have to comply with Paulwell's directive. Digicel appealed to the Privy Council, Jamaica's final court of appeal, which upheld the appellate court's decision in 2007.

Digicel appealed the decision to the United Kingdom Privy Council. In January 2010, the Council ruled in favour of the OUR, meaning LIME (formerly Cable & Wireless Jamaica) was allowed to keep the J$340 million Digicel had been ordered to pay them by the Jamaican courts. In 2015, LIME's parent company acquired Columbus Communications and decided to adopt the brand name FLOW for its consumer-facing business, replacing the LIME name. As of May 2016, the LIME name was fully discontinued.

2010–present 
Digicel Mobile Money, a mobile banking service, was launched in Fiji in July 2010. Also in 2010, Digicel launched TchoTcho, a cash app for money transfers to phones in Haiti. In 2011, Mobile Money in Fiji was expanded to allow transfers to and from Australia and New Zealand at no cost.

In February 2011, Digicel took a controlling stake in Netxar Technologies, a leading systems integrator in the Caribbean region. In March, Digicel announced that it was selling its operations in Honduras and El Salvador to Mexican telecom company América Móvil, and América Móvil was selling its operations in Jamaica to Digicel. In March 2012, Digicel acquired Comcel/Voila, its main competitor in Haiti.

In May 2012, the Tax Authority Jamaica (TAJ) visited Digicel's offices in New Kingston with an order from the Jamaican Supreme Court to look for data regarding the company's payment of the general consumption tax. A couple of weeks later, TAJ and Digicel agreed to have more dialogue surrounding the situation.

In October 2012, América Móvil announced it wouldn't acquire Digicel's operations in El Salvador.

In June 2013, Digicel announced that it would invest $9 billion in a mobile phone network in Myanmar, if granted a licence. However, Digicel lost the licence bid to Telenor and Ooredoo.

Digicel acquired SAT Telecom, a cable and internet company in Dominica, in February 2014 and relaunched the brand as Digicel Play in October of that year. In September, Digicel acquired Telstar Cable Limited in Jamaica.

In 2015, TchoTcho was relaunched as MonCash with additional banking services. In September 2016, Digicel Play launched as Play Go, a live streaming service.

In July 2017, Digicel bought 16.6% of Tonga Cable from the government.

In January 2019, O'Brien named Jean-Yves Charlier as chief executive, replacing Michael Willner. Jean-Yves stepped down as the Group CEO of Digicel in July 2020, and Oliver Coughlin was named the CEO for Digicel's Caribbean and Latin American business.

In May 2020, Digicel announced plans to restructure its debt. The restructuring plan was approved by Digicel's bondholders and completed in June 2020. As part of the exchange, O'Brien contributed $50 million in assets to Digicel, consisting of the company's Jamaican headquarters and $25 million in cash.

In November 2020, Digicel announced that, in its financial second quarter to the end of September, its earnings have dropped due to impact of the Covid-19 pandemic.

In October 2021, Digicel announced the sale of its Pacific operations to Telstra Group, an Australian telecommunications company. The sale was estimated at USD$1.6 billion. However this was thrown into doubt in March 2022 when the Papua New Guinea government imposed a retrospective tax of over $100m on the company.

In September 2022, credit rating service Fitch issued a warning of a potential debt default. The Irish Times suggested There’s little or no equity value in Digicel.

Corporate sponsorship
Digicel is a sponsor of Caribbean, Central American and Asia-Pacific sports teams, including the Special Olympics teams in these regions. From 2005 to 2018, Digicel sponsored The West Indies cricket team.

In 2008, Digicel announced that they would sponsor the Vanuatu national cricket team, as well as the National Rugby 15s and 7s teams. That same year, Digicel became the sponsor of the Digicel Cup for rugby in Fiji.

In April 2013, Digicel was announced as the first global sponsor of the 2013 inaugural tournament for the Caribbean Premier League.

In 2021, Digicel sponsored the PlayGo Emerge Competition for short films made in the Caribbean.

Digicel Foundation 
In 2004, Digicel and its shareholders set up the Digicel Foundation in Jamaica.

The Digicel Foundation is active in Jamaica, Haïti, Trinidad and Tobago and Papua New Guinea. In Haïti, the Digicel Foundation helped rebuild after the 2010 Haïtian earthquake struck Port-au-Prince on January 12, 2010. Projects have included building primary schools and restoring the historic Iron Market.

Digicel Group’s mobile operations 

The following is a list of Digicel Group’s Pacific operations. These operations are headed by an office in Port Moresby, Papua New Guinea, as well as one in Singapore. Digicel’s Pacific operations were acquired by Australian telecommunications company Telstra on July 14, 2022.

The following is a list of the North Atlantic, Caribbean and Central American operations of Digicel Group. All report to Digicel Group's headquarters in Kingston, Jamaica.

Competitors 
In the Caribbean region, the main competitor is American-owned Liberty Latin America.

See also 
Southern Caribbean Fiber

References

External links
Digicel Homepage

 
Communications in Haiti
Communications in Jamaica
Mobile phone companies of El Salvador
Mobile phone companies of Trinidad and Tobago
Companies based in Kingston, Jamaica
Jamaican brands
Telecommunications companies established in 2001